Aces is the third studio album by the American country music singer-songwriter Suzy Bogguss, released on August 27, 1991, through Liberty Records. The album spawned three Top 10 hits on the country charts –  "Outbound Plane," "Aces" and "Letting Go" –  and stayed at No. 1 in album sales and in the top ten on the country charts for five weeks.

Aces is Bogguss's highest-charting album and has gone on to earn an RIAA Platinum certification and was nominated for the 1992 CMA "Horizon Award". Following the success of Aces, the Country Music Association recognized Bogguss' achievements in 1992 by giving her its Horizon Award, which is awarded annually to the artist who has demonstrated the most significant creative growth and development.

"Still Hold On" was originally recorded by Kim Carnes on her 1981 album, Mistaken Identity.

Promotional videos
Two music videos were made to promote the album: "Outbound Plane" and "Letting Go". Both were directed by Deaton-Flanigen. The story of "Outbound Plane" depicts life out in a deserted airport featuring Bogguss and her lover as central characters, and "Letting Go" tells the story of a mother remembering her daughter from her early years until she leaves for college.

Track listing

Reception

Alanna Nash of Entertainment Weekly wrote that Aces "challenges the conceit of the stereotypical passive country female, willing to put up with all manner of cantankerous behavior to hold on to a man." She also said that "In one gutsy song after another, Bogguss — whose clear soprano rings without artifice — takes no guff, emerging as a woman and singer of substance.." Bryan Buss of Allmusic stated that Bogguss' "appealing girl-next-door approach, her choice to straddle the fence between contemporary and traditional C&W and her perfectly pitched voice are what helped [Aces] be the catalyst for making her a household name among country music fans."

Personnel
Suzy Bogguss – lead vocals, backing vocals

Additional musicians

Recording staff
Suzy Bogguss – producer
Jimmy Bowen – producer
John Guess – engineer
Bob Bullock – overdub engineer
Tim Kish – overdub engineer
Russ Martin – overdub engineer
Marty Williams – overdub engineer
Glenn Meadows – mastering engineer
Milan Bogdan – digital editor
Janie West – song selection assistant

Chart performance

Album

Singles

Certifications
RIAA Certification

Release details

References

1991 albums
Suzy Bogguss albums
Liberty Records albums
Albums produced by Jimmy Bowen